Buryatia may refer to:
Republic of Buryatia, a federal subject of Russia
Buryat Autonomous Soviet Socialist Republic (1923–1992), an administrative division of the Russian SFSR, Soviet Union
2593 Buryatia, a main-belt asteroid